The City Sports Complex, previously KMC Sports Complex, is located at Kashmir Road, in Karachi, Sindh, Pakistan.

Various sports are played at the Complex, including skating, swimming and basketball. The Complex has also hosted boxing and tennis matches for various countries. In summer 2011, the CSC has undergone renovation of its tennis courts, which have also been repainted. However, the squash courts are in a state of neglect. A tennis coach is available in the morning and evening. In addition, CSC plays host to many tennis events organized by the STA (Sindh Tennis Association) every year.
Membership is available quite easily. Starting fees are Rs 8000, and then about Rs 1000 per month. However, the timings for playing tennis are limited: just 7am to 10am and 5pm to 8pm, leading to crowding, especially in the summer holidays.

There is a mosque in the premises where people from the vicinity come for prayers. Also there is a jogging track that is accessible to all. In order to generate additional revenue, the premises of CSC are frequently used for wedding ceremonies.

References

External links 
 Body for City sports complex - DAWN.com
 City sports complex in shambles as citizens suffer - DAWN.com

Indoor arenas in Pakistan
Sports venues in Karachi
Table tennis venues
Table tennis in Pakistan
Tennis venues in Pakistan
Swimming venues in Pakistan
Boxing venues in Pakistan
Basketball venues in Pakistan